Bruges is the capital and largest city of the province of West Flanders in the Flemish Region of Belgium, in the northwest of the country, and the sixth-largest city of the country by population.

The historic city centre is a prominent World Heritage Site of UNESCO. It is oval and about 430 hectares in size. The city's total population is 117,073 (1 January 2008), of whom around 20,000 live in the city centre.

Along with a few other canal-based northern cities, such as Amsterdam and St Petersburg, it is sometimes referred to as the Venice of the North. Bruges has significant economic importance, thanks to its port, and was once one of the world's chief commercial cities. Bruges is a major tourism destination within Belgium and is well known as the seat of the College of Europe, a university institute for European studies.

Etymology

The name probably derives from the Old Dutch for 'bridge': . The form  would be a southern Dutch variant. The Dutch word and the English bridge both derive from Proto-Germanic .

History

Origins
Bruges was a location of coastal settlement during prehistory. This Bronze Age and Iron Age settlement are unrelated to medieval city development. In the Bruges area, the first fortifications were built after Julius Caesar's conquest of the Menapii in the first century BC, to protect the coastal area against pirates. The Franks took over the whole region from the Gallo-Romans around the fourth century and administered it as the Pagus Flandrensis. The Viking incursions of the ninth century prompted Count Baldwin I of Flanders to reinforce the Roman fortifications; trade soon resumed with England and Scandinavia. Early medieval habitation starts in the ninth and tenth centuries on the Burgh terrain, probably with a fortified settlement and church.

Golden age (12th to 15th centuries)

In 1089, Bruges became the capital of the County of Flanders. Bruges received its city charter on 27 July 1128, and new walls and canals were built. By the 12th century, the city had gained an autonomous administration. Het Zwin (Golden Inlet), the tidal inlet of Bruges, was crucial to the development of local commerce. Since about 1050, gradual silting had caused the city to lose its direct access to the sea. A storm in 1134, however, re-established this access, through the creation of a natural channel at the Zwin. The new sea arm stretched to Damme, a city that became the commercial outpost for Bruges.

Bruges had a strategic location at the crossroads of the northern Hanseatic League trade and the southern trade routes. Bruges was already included in the circuit of the Flemish and French cloth fairs at the beginning of the 13th century, but when the old system of fairs broke down, the entrepreneurs of Bruges innovated. They developed or borrowed from Italy, new forms of merchant capitalism, whereby several merchants would share the risks and profits and pool their knowledge of markets. They employed new forms of economic exchange, including bills of exchange (i.e. promissory notes) and letters of credit.  The city eagerly welcomed foreign traders, most notably the Portuguese traders selling pepper and other spices.

With the reawakening of town life in the 12th century, a wool market, a woollens weaving industry, and the cloth market all profited from the shelter of city walls, where surpluses could be safely accumulated under the patronage of the counts of Flanders. The city's entrepreneurs reached out to make economic colonies of England and Scotland's wool-producing districts. English contacts brought Normandy grain and Gascon wines. Hanseatic ships filled the harbor, which had to be expanded beyond Damme to Sluys to accommodate the new cog-ships.

In 1277, the first merchant fleet from the Republic of Genoa appeared in the port of Bruges, the first of the merchant colony that made Bruges the main link to the trade of the Mediterranean. This development opened not only the trade in spices from the Levant but also advanced commercial and financial techniques and a flood of capital that soon took over the banking of Bruges. The building where the Genoese Republic housed its commercial representation in the city still survives, now housing the Frietmuseum.

The Bourse opened in 1309 (most likely the first stock exchange in the world) and developed into the most sophisticated money market of the Low Countries in the 14th century. By the time Venetian galleys first appeared, in 1314, they were latecomers. Numerous foreign merchants were welcomed in Bruges, such as the Castilian wool merchants who first arrived in the 13th century. After the Castilian wool monopoly ended, the Basques, many hailing from Bilbao (Biscay), thrived as merchants (wool, iron commodities, etc.) and established their own commercial consulate in Bruges by the mid-15th century. The foreign merchants expanded the city's trading zones. They maintained separate communities governed by their own laws until the economic collapse after 1700.

Such wealth gave rise to social upheavals, which were for the most part harshly contained by the militia. In 1302, however, after the Bruges Matins (the night-time massacre of the French garrison in Bruges by the members of the local Flemish militia on 18 May 1302), the population joined forces with the Count of Flanders against the French, culminating in the victory at the Battle of the Golden Spurs, fought near Kortrijk on 11 July. The statue of Jan Breydel and Pieter de Coninck, the leaders of the uprising, can still be seen on the Big Market square. The city maintained a militia as a permanent paramilitary body. It gained flexibility and high prestige through close ties to a guild of the organized militia, comprising professionals and specialized units. Militia men bought and maintained their own weapons and armour, according to their family status and wealth. Later, Bruges would be consumed in the Flemish revolts that occurred around the County of Flanders between 1323 and 1328.

At the end of the 14th century, Bruges became one of the Four Members, along with Brugse Vrije, Ghent, and Ypres. Together they formed a parliament; however, they frequently quarrelled amongst themselves.

In the 15th century, Philip the Good, Duke of Burgundy, set up a court in Bruges, as well as Brussels and Lille, attracting several artists, bankers, and other prominent personalities from all over Europe. The weavers and spinners of Bruges were thought to be the best in the world, and the population of Bruges grew to at least 46,000 inhabitants at this time around 1350 AD.

The new oil-painting techniques of the Flemish school gained world renown. The first book in English ever printed was published in Bruges by William Caxton. Edward IV and Richard III of England were then living in exile in Bruges.

Decline after 1500

Starting around 1500, the Zwin channel, (the Golden Inlet) which had given the city its prosperity, began silting up and the Golden Era ended. The city soon fell behind Antwerp as the economic flagship of the Low Countries. During the 17th century, the lace industry took off, and various efforts to bring back the glorious past were made. During the 1650s, the city was the base for Charles II of England and his court in exile. The maritime infrastructure was modernized, and new connections with the sea were built, but without much success, as Antwerp became increasingly dominant. Bruges became impoverished and gradually faded in importance.

The symbolist novelist George Rodenbach made the city into a character in his novel Bruges-la-Morte, meaning "Bruges-the-dead", which was adapted into Erich Wolfgang Korngold's opera, Die tote Stadt (The Dead City).

19th century and later revival

In the second half of the 19th century, Bruges became one of the world's first tourist destinations, attracting wealthy British and French tourists. By 1909, the 'Bruges Forward: Society to Improve Tourist' association had come into operation.

In World War I, German forces occupied Bruges. However, the city suffered virtually no damage, and was liberated on 19 October 1918 by the Allies. The city was occupied by the Germans from 1940 during World War II and was again spared destruction. On 12 September 1944, it was liberated by the 12th Manitoba Dragoons' Canadian troops. The liberation of the city was facilitated by the bridge, now known as the Canada Bridge, connecting the outer municipalities with the city centre.

After 1965, the original medieval city experienced a "renaissance". Restorations of residential and commercial structures, historic monuments, and churches generated a surge in tourism and economic activity in the downtown area. International tourism has boomed, and new efforts resulted in Bruges being designated European Capital of Culture in 2002. It attracts some eight million tourists annually.

The port of Zeebrugge was built in 1907. The Germans used it for their U-boats in World War I. It was greatly expanded in the 1970s and early 1980s and has become one of Europe's most important and modern ports.

Geography

The municipality comprises:
 The historic city centre of Bruges, Sint-Jozef and Sint-Pieters (I)
 Koolkerke (II)
 Sint-Andries (III)
 Sint-Michiels (IV)
 Assebroek (V)
 Sint-Kruis (VI)
 Dudzele (VII)
 Lissewege (with Zeebrugge and Zwankendamme) (VIII)

Climate
Bruges has an oceanic climate (Köppen Cfb).

Landmarks, arts, and culture

The medieval architecture in Bruges is mostly intact, making it one of the best-preserved medieval towns in Europe. The "Historic Centre of Bruges" has been a UNESCO World Heritage Site since 2000. Its medieval buildings include the Church of Our Lady, whose brick spire reaches , making it the world's second-highest brick tower/building. The sculpture Madonna and Child, which can be seen in the transept, is believed to be the only of Michelangelo's sculptures to have left Italy within his lifetime.

Bruges' best-known landmark is the Belfry of Bruges, a 13th-century belfry housing a municipal carillon comprising 47 bells. The Belfry of Bruges, independent of the previously mentioned UNESCO World Heritage Site in Bruges, is included on the World Heritage Site of Belfries of Belgium and France. The city still employs a full-time carillonneur, who gives free concerts regularly. 

In addition to the "Historic Centre of Bruges" and the tower included in the "Belfries of Belgium and France", Bruges is also home to a third UNESCO World Heritage Site; the Ten Wijngaerde Béguinage, a beguinage built in the 13th century, is included in the World Heritage Site of "Flemish Béguinages".

Craft 
Bruges is known for its lace, a textile technique. Moreover, the city and its lace would go on to inspire the Thread Routes film series, the second episode of which, shot in 2011, was partly set in Bruges.

Several beers are named after the city, such as Brugge Blond, Brugge Tripel, Brugs, Brugse Babbelaar, Brugse Straffe Hendrik, and Brugse Zot. However, only the latter two—Brugse Zot and Brugse Straffe Hendrik–is brewed in the city itself, in the De Halve Maan Brewery.

Entertainment 

 Aquariustheater
 Boudewijn Seapark (an amusement park in Sint-Michiels)
 Biekorf
 Cinema Liberty
 Cinema Lumière (alternative movies)
 Concertgebouw
 De Dijk
 De Werf
 Het Entrepot
 Joseph Ryelandtzaal
 Kinepolis Bruges
 Magdalenazaal
 Sirkeltheater
 
 Studio Hall

Festivals

Museums and historic sites (non-religious)
Bruges is home to many museums. Its art museums include the Arents House, as well as the Groeningemuseum, which has an extensive collection of medieval and early modern art. Members of the 15th century Early Netherlandish school of painters are represented, including works by Jan van Eyck. Van Eyck, as well as Hans Memling, lived and worked in Bruges.

The preserved old city gateways: the Kruispoort, the Gentpoort, the Smedenpoort and the Ezelpoort. The Dampoort, the Katelijnepoort and the Boeveriepoort are gone.

The Old St. John's Hospital (Hans Memling museum) and Our Lady of the Potteries are Hospital museums. The city is known for Bruggemuseum ("Bruges Museum"), the general name for a group of 11 different historical museums in the city, including:

 Gruuthusemuseum, a museum for the house of Louis de Gruuthuse.
 Church of Our Lady
 Archaeological Museum
 Gentpoort
 Belfry
 City Hall on the  square
 Provinciaal Hof (Provincial Court)
 Manor of the Brugse Vrije
 Museum of Folklore
 Guido Gezelle Museum
 Koelewei (Cool Meadow) Mill
 Sint-Janshuis (St. John's House) Mill

Bruges' non-municipal museums include the Brewery Museum, Hof Bladelin, Choco-Story (chocolate museum), Lumina Domestica (lamp museum), Museum-Gallery Xpo: Salvador Dalí, Diamond Museum, Frietmuseum (a museum dedicated to Belgian fries), Historium (museum of the medieval history of Bruges), Lace centre, St. George's Archers Guild, St. Sebastian's Archers’ Guild, St. Trudo Abbey, and the Public Observatory Beisbroek.

Religious sites and landmarks 

Bruges, the patron saint of which is Andrew the Apostle, is also known for its religious landmarks. The Basilica of the Holy Blood, in particular, houses the relic of the Holy Blood, which was brought to the city after the Second Crusade by Thierry of Alsace, and is paraded every year through the streets of the city. More than 1,600 inhabitants take part in this mile-long religious procession, many dressed as medieval knights or crusaders.

Other religious landmarks and museums include the Church of Our Lady, English Convent, Jerusalem Church, Saint Salvator's Cathedral, St. Trudo's Abbey, Ten Wijngaerde Béguinage, and Ter Doest Abbey in Lissewege.

Gallery

Transport

Road
Bruges has motorway connections in all directions:
  to Ostend
   to Ghent and Brussels
   to Veurne and France
   to Kortrijk and Tournai
   to Zeebrugge
   to Antwerp

Driving within the 'egg', the historical centre enclosed by the main circle of canals in Bruges is discouraged by traffic management schemes, including a network of one-way streets. The system encourages the use of set routes leading to central car parks and direct exit routes. The car parks are convenient for the central commercial and tourist areas; they are not expensive.

Railway
Bruges' main railway station is the focus of lines to the Belgian coast. It also provides at least hourly trains to all other major cities in Belgium, as well as to Lille in France. Further there are several regional and local trains.

A third track is being constructed between Bruges and Dudzele, the junction for Zeebrugge to alleviate congestion. Similarly, two extra tracks are being built between Bruges and Ghent.

Bus links to the centre are frequent, though the railway station is just a 10-minute walk from the main shopping streets and a 20-minute walk from Market Square.

Air
The national Brussels Airport, one hour away by train or car, offers the best connections. Recently there also started a direct bus line from Brussels South Charleroi Airport to Bruges.

Public city transport

Bruges has an extensive web of bus lines, operated by De Lijn, providing access to the city centre and the suburbs (city lines) and to many towns and villages in the region around the city (regional lines).

In support of the municipal traffic management (see "Road" above), free public transport is available for those who park their cars in the main railway station car park.

Cycling
Although a few streets are restricted, no part of Bruges is car-free.

Cars are required to yield to pedestrians and cyclists. Plans have long been underway to ban cars altogether from the historic center of Bruges or to restrict traffic much more than it currently is, but these plans have yet to come to fruition. In 2005, signs were changed for the convenience of cyclists, allowing two-way cycle traffic on more streets; however, car traffic has not decreased.  Nevertheless, in common with many cities in the region, there are thousands of cyclists in the city of Bruges.

Port

The port of Bruges is Zeebrugge (Flemish for Bruges-on-Sea).

On 6 March 1987, the British ferry MS Herald of Free Enterprise capsized after leaving the port, killing 187 people, in the worst disaster involving a British civilian vessel since 1919; it had set sail with its bow door open. The Herald of Free Enterprise was a passenger ship bound for the Port of Dover in Kent. Most of the occupants had taken advantage of a newspaper promotion offering a £1 return trip from Dover to Zeebrugge.

Sports

Between 1998 and 2016, Bruges hosted the start of the annual Tour of Flanders cycle race, held in April and one of the biggest sporting events in Belgium.

Football is also popular in Bruges; the city hosts two professional football teams, both of which play at the top level (Belgian First Division) Club Brugge K.V. are the current national champions, while the second team, Cercle Brugge K.S.V., was recently promoted to the first tier. Both teams play their home games at the Jan Breydel Stadium (30,000 seats) in Sint-Andries. There are plans for a new stadium for Club Brugge with about 45,000 seats in the north of the city, while the city council would renovate and reduce the capacity of the Jan Breydel Stadium for Cercle Brugge.

In 2000, Bruges was one of the eight host cities for the UEFA European Football Championship, co-hosted by Belgium and its neighbour the Netherlands.

In 2021, Bruges, along with Leuven, is to host the UCI Road Racing Championship.

Education
Bruges is a centre for education in West Flanders. Next to the several common primary and secondary schools, there are a few colleges, like the VIVES (a fusion of the former KHBO (Katholieke Hogeschool Brugge Oostende) and the KATHO (katholieke hogeschool) or the HOWEST (Hogeschool West-Vlaanderen) and Sint-Leocollege. Furthermore, the city is home to the College of Europe, a prestigious institution of postgraduate studies in European Economics, Law, and Politics, and of the United Nations University Institute on Comparative Regional Integration Studies (UNU-CRIS), a Research and Training Institute of the United Nations University specialising in the comparative study of regional integration.

Town twinning policy
On principle, Bruges has to date never entered into close collaboration with twin cities. Without denying the usefulness of these schemes for towns with fewer international contacts, the main reason is that Bruges would find it difficult to choose between cities and thinks that it has enough work already with its many international contacts. Also, it was thought in Bruges that twinning was too often an occasion for city authorities and representatives to travel at public expense.

This principle resulted, in the 1950s, in Bruges refusing a jumelage with Nice, Nuremberg, Locarno and Venice, signed by a Belgian ambassador without previous consultation. In the 1970s, a Belgian consul in Oldenburg made the mayor of Bruges sign a declaration of friendship which he tried to present, in vain, as a jumelage.

The twinning between some of the former communes, merged with Bruges in 1971, was discontinued.

This does not mean that Bruges would not be interested in cooperation with others, as well in the short term as in the long run, for particular projects. Here follow a few examples.

  Bastogne, Luxembourg, Belgium After World War II and into the 1970s, Bruges, more specifically the Fire Brigade of Bruges, entertained friendly relations with Bastogne. Each year a free holiday was offered at the seaside in Zeebrugge, to children from the Nuts city.
  Arolsen, Hesse, Germany From the 1950s until the 1980s, Bruges was the patron of the Belgian First Regiment of Horse Guards, quartered in Arolsen.
  Salamanca, Castilla y León, Spain Both towns having been made European Capital of Culture in 2002, Bruges had some exchanges organized with Salamanca.
  Mons, Hainaut, Belgium In 2007, cultural and artistic cooperation between Mons and Bruges was inaugurated.
  Burgos, Castilla y León, Spain On 29 January 2007, the mayors of Burgos and Bruges signed a declaration of intent about future cooperation on cultural, touristic and economic matters.

Bruges in popular culture

Notable people

Literature 

Hendrik Conscience's The Lion of Flanders, or the Battle of the Golden Spurs (1836), is a historical-fiction novel based on the medieval Franco-Flemish War and the Battle of the Golden Spurs, both of which historically include Bruges.
Ludwig Bemelmans' children's novel The Golden Basket (1936) tells the story of a family's visit to Bruges. In the novel, the two sisters stay at the Golden Basket hotel in Bruges with their father. On a visit to Bruges cathedral with the innkeeper's son, the sisters meet a dozen little schoolgirls. This would mark the first appearance of Bemelmans' best-known character, Madeline.
The last chapter of Saul Bellow's 1953 novel The Adventures of Augie March features the titular character driving through France on his way to Bruges on business.
Bruges-la-Morte (1892), a short novel by the Belgian author Georges Rodenbach. The libretto of Erich Wolfgang Korngold's opera Die Tote Stadt (1920) is based on this book.
 The detective stories of Belgian writer Pieter Aspe are situated in Bruges.
 Niccolò Rising (1986), the first volume of Dorothy Dunnett's eight-book series, House of Niccolò, is largely set in Bruges. Other books in the series also have sections set in the Belgian city.
 Alan Hollinghurst's 1994 novel The Folding Star is set in a Flemish town that is recognisably Bruges.
 L'Astrologue de Bruges ("The Astrologer of Bruges," 1994), a Belgian bande dessinée in the Yoko Tsuno comic series, is entirely set in both contemporary and 1545's Bruges.
The first part of the "Letters from Zedelghem" story in David Mitchel's Cloud Atlas (2004) takes place near Bruges, in the titular Zedelghem municipality.

Film 

 Fred Zinneman's The Nun's Story is a 1959 dramatic film starring Audrey Hepburn that is primarily set in Bruges.
 The Killer Is on the Phone is a 1972 giallo film set in Bruges.
 The main antagonist of the Austin Powers film series, Dr. Evil, was raised in Bruges.
 The 2008 film In Bruges, starring Colin Farrell and Brendan Gleeson, is set almost entirely in Bruges. Throughout the film, which was directed by British-Irish director Martin McDonagh, the city's major landmarks and history are mentioned repeatedly, as are the contrasted viewpoints of the two lead characters of the story.
 In 2014 Bollywood film PK, opening scenes involving Anushka Sharma and Sushant Singh Rajput (including song Chaar Kadam) are set in Bruges.
 The story of the removal of the Madonna of Bruges being removed by the Nazis and then returned is told in the fact-based 2014 movie The Monuments Men.
 The 2019 Hallmark movie, Love, Romance & Chocolate, starring Lacey Chabert, takes place in Bruges.

Television and music 

 The song "Marieke" by Belgian singer Jacques Brel is about a Flemish girl, Marieke, whom Brel once loved and lived "between the towers of Bruges and Ghent."
Floris, a Dutch television action series written by Gerard Soeteman, depicts castles located in Belgian cities, including Bruges.
In the seventh episode of Where Is My Friend's Home (2015–2016), a South-Korean reality-travel TV show, the cast tours Bruges as part of the second season's trip to Belgium.
 Some scenes from episode 6 of season 2 of Marvel's Agents of S.H.I.E.L.D. take place in Bruges, where a local beer, "Straffe Hendrik," is mentioned and shown.
 The 2022 Nu-Core album The Generation of Danger by the band Tallah is a concept album about a world class scientist fed up of being swept under the rug, and decides to force the whole world to participate in "the greatest experiment the world of science has ever seen". The entire story takes place in the city of Bruges.

Notes

Further reading

External links

 

 
Municipalities of West Flanders
Port cities and towns in Belgium
Port cities and towns of the North Sea
Provincial capitals of Flanders
Trading posts of the Hanseatic League
World Heritage Sites in Belgium